L'Aqueduc de Louveciennes (Louveciennes Aqueduct), sometimes called Aqueduc de Marly (Marly Aqueduct) is an aqueduct built in the 17th century under the reign of Louis XIV, located in Louveciennes (now in the French département of the Yvelines, in the west suburb of Paris). Now out of service, the aqueduct has been listed as a Monument historique since 1953. It was a part of the hydraulic network intended to provide water for the Château de Marly and the Gardens of Versailles from the Seine river, using a huge pump called the Machine de Marly.

The aqueduct consists of 36 arches. Its length is 643m for a width varying from 2 to 4.4m, and a height from 10 to 20 metres.

History
It was built by Jules Hardouin-Mansard, then Robert de Cotte, from 1681 to 1685. A monumental machine, called the machine de Marly, situated on the Seine river at Bougival, pumped water out of the river with the help of 14 paddle wheels. By pipes put on two paved inclines, the water was pumped up the 126 metres of the hill of Louveciennes. The water flowed into the reservoir at the summit of the tour du Levant ("East tower") at the north-eastern end of the aqueduct. Using gravity by a one metre wide and two metres deep canal, sealed inside with lead, the water was directed toward the tour du Jongleur ("tower of the Juggler") at the southern end of the aqueduct. From there, a siphon ensured the supply of a reservoir called réservoir des Deux Portes and the nearby tanks of Marly and Louveciennes.

The aqueduct was retired from service in 1866 and replaced by underground pipes.

During the Siege of Paris (1870-1871), the tour du Levant was used as an observation point by the future German emperor William I and the chancellor Bismarck. This tower was renovated between 1998 and 2000.

Gallery

See also
 List of aqueducts

Notes and references

Sources

 Translation of the French article

Palace of Versailles
Aqueducts in France